John Webster (born December 18, 1957) is a musician, engineer and producer who primarily plays keyboards. He began his musical career as a child, trained in classical piano until his early teens, and then moved on to playing in rock bands. One of his first bands, Stonebolt, landed a top 30 U.S. hit with its first release in 1978 and went on to record four successful albums.

He joined the band Red Rider in 1984, performing on that year's Breaking Curfew album and remaining with the group until they disbanded in 1990. Webster then continued to work closely in productions with its leader, Tom Cochrane, including his highly successful Mad Mad World album.

Through the 80s and 90s he worked on many major recordings done in Vancouver's Little Mountain Sound Studios with producers Bruce Fairbairn and Bob Rock.

Webster has appeared on many albums by established artists all over the musical spectrum. His production achievements include two Juno awards, many nominations, and numerous multi-platinum Canadian releases in both languages.

He also composes music for films, including Rapid Fire (2005) and Absolute Zero.

He performed live with R.S.O (Richie Sambora/Orianthi) in 2016 with dates in Europe, Asia, and South America

His partner is songwriter/artist Annette Ducharme.

Discography
 22nd Century (band) — The Twenty Second Century — keyboards, producer, engineer, mix
 22nd Century (band) — Where's Howie — producer, engineer, mix
 Lee Aaron	- Fire and Gasoline  - keyboards, engineer, mix
 Lee Aaron	- Diamond Baby Blues  - keyboards, producer, engineer, mix
 Lee Aaron	- Radio on  - engineer
 Lee Aaron	- Elevate  - engineer
 AC/DC — The Razors Edge — programming 
 Aerosmith — Get a Grip — keyboards, programming 
 Aerosmith  — Nine Lives — keyboards
 Aerosmith  — Pump — keyboards]
 After All — How High the Moon — producer, keyboards
 Annihilator  — Set the World on Fire — keyboards
 Jann Arden — Covers 2	, Spotlight , Christmas  — keyboards
 Bif Naked — Five Songs and a Poem — keyboards
 Bif Naked	-i bificus - producer, keyboards
 Bif Naked — Superbeautifulmonster	— keyboards, mix
 Jordie Birch  — Beatrice  — mix 
 Jaydee Bixby	— Cowboys and Cadillacs — producer, engineer, mix, keyboards 
 Jaydee Bixby	— Easy to Love — producer, engineer, mix, keyboards
 Blue Murder — Blue Murder — keyboards, keyboard programming 
 Bon Jovi  — Slippery When Wet — programming 
 Bon Jovi  — New Jersey — programming 
 Boom Desjardins — Avec le Temps —	producer, engineer, mix, keyboards
 Boom Desjardins —	Boom Desjardins — producer, engineer, mix, keyboards
 Boom Desjardins — Rock le Quebec — producer, engineer, mix, keyboards
 Black Veiled Brides	- Black Veiled Brides IV - keyboards
 Michael Bublé — Christmas — Hammond B3 organ
 Michael Bublé and Van Morrison — Real,Real Gone — keyboards
 Captain Tractor — Celebrity Traffic Jam — producer, engineer, mix, keyboards
 Cher — Love Hurts	—		 keyboards 
 Cinderella — Long Cold Winter — keyboards 
 The Clumsy Lovers  —	After the Flood — producer, engineer, mix, keyboards
 The Clumsy Lovers — Smart Kid  — producer, engineer, mix, keyboards
 Tom Cochrane 	— Mad Mad World — arranger, keyboards 
 Tom Cochrane 	— Ragged Ass Road — keyboards, producer, engineer 
 Tom Cochrane 	— Songs of a Circling Spirit — mix 
 Tom Cochrane 	— Trapeze — engineer, mix 
 Tom Cochrane 	— X-Ray Sierra	— producer, engineer, mix, keyboards
 Tom Cochrane & Red Rider — The Symphony Sessions — keyboards
 Tom Cochrane & Red Rider — Tom Cochrane & Red Rider — keyboards 
 Tom Cochrane & Red Rider — Victory Day — bass, keyboards, producer 
 Alice Cooper — Hey Stoopid — keyboards
Travis Cormier  -  Dollars and Hearts  -keyboards 
 The Cult 	— Sonic Temple 	— keyboards
 Alan Doyle    - A Week at the Warehouse - keyboards
 Annette Ducharme 	— Bloom — producer, engineer, mixing, keyboards
 Annette Ducharme — Blue Girl — producer, engineer, mixing, keyboards
 Annette Ducharme  — Sanctuary —  producer, engineer, mixing, keyboards
 Annette Ducharme — Toilet Trained —  producer, engineer, mixing, keyboards 
 Annette Ducharme  — Tortured — producer, engineer, mixing, keyboards
 Electric Boys — Funk-O-Metal Carpet Ride — keyboards
 Johnny Ferreira — Sax on the Beach — producer, engineer, mix, keyboards
 Nina Gordon — Tonight and the Rest of My Life... — keyboards
 Gowan — Lost Brotherhood —  keyboards 
 Grapes of Wrath — Treehouse — keyboards
 Oliver Haze — Wandering Trip — producer, engineer, mix, keyboards
 The Heck — The Heck — producer, engineer, mix, keyboards
 Idle Eyes — Idle Eyes — keyboards 
 The Immigrants  — The Immigrants  — producer, engineer, mix, keyboards
 Colin James — Take It from the Top — keyboards
 Jet Set Satellite	— Blueprint — producer, engineer, mix, keyboards
 Jonas — Jonas — producer, engineer, mix, keyboards
 Jonas	— Promised Land — producer, engineer, mix, keyboards
 Jonas	— Suite Life — producer, engineer, mix, keyboards
 Kingdom Come — Kingdom Come	— keyboards
 Paul Laine	- Stick it in your Ear - keyboards
 Eric Lapointe  — Invite Les Vatours  — arranger, keyboards, programming 
 Eric Lapointe  — A l'Ombre de L'Ange —  arranger, keyboards, programming 
 Limblifter —	Bellaclava — keyboards  
 Little Caesar — Little Caesar — keyboards
 London Quireboys	— London Quireboys — keyboards
 Sean MacDonald — Butterflies — mix
 Raymond May —	Unadulterated Addiction —  keyboards 
 Kim Mitchell — Aural Fixations — keyboards, producer 
 The Moffats — Submodalities  — keyboards
 Stefane Moraille (Bran Van 3000) — producer, engineer, mix, keyboards
 Mötley Crüe — Decade of Decadence — keyboards
 Mötley Crüe — Dr. Feelgood — keyboards, programming 
 Nazanin — Nazanin	— producer, engineer, mix, keyboards
 Never the Bride	- Never the Bride - keyboards
 Paperboys — Molinos — keyboards, producer, engineer, mix 
 The Paperboys — Postcards — producer, engineer, mix, keyboards
 Kevin Parent	 — Fangless Wolf Faces Winter — keyboards		
 Kevin Parent 	— Le Grand Parleur	— producer, engineer, mix, keyboards
 Kevin Parent — Les Vents ont Changé — producer, engineer, mix, keyboards
 A Perfect Day	 — All Over Everything — producer, engineer, mix, keyboards
 A Perfect Day	 — A Perfect Day — producer, engineer, mix, keyboards
 Poison — Flesh and Blood — keyboards
 Marshall Potts — The Storm — producer, engineer, mix, keyboards
 Pure	— Generation Six-pack — mix
 Pure	— Pure — producer, engineer
 Rampage - Randy's Final Rampage - Producer (2019-08-01) unreleased final album of the late Randy Rampage
 Red Rider	— Breaking Curfew — keyboards 
 Jodi Rescher	— producer, engineer, mix, keyboards
 Rock and Hyde — Under the Volcano — keyboards, programming 
 Rockhead 	— Rockhead 	— keyboards
 Mick Ronson — Heaven and Hull — keyboards 
 David Lee Roth —	A Little Ain't Enough – keyboards 
 Rush — Counterparts — keyboards
 Rymes with Orange — One More Mile — mix
 Rymes with Orange — Trapped in the Machine — producer, engineer, mix, keyboards
 Salvador Dream — Salvador Dream — producer, engineer, mix, keyboards
 Scorpions — Face the Heat — keyboards 
 Ron Sexsmith	— Late Bloomer — keyboards
 R.S.O (Richie Sambora/Orianthi)  - Radio Free America - keyboards
 Soma City Ward — mix
 SoulDecision — single — remix  
 Soundtrack — A Guy Thing (Julia Stiles/Jason Lee film) — engineer, mix
 Soundtrack — Urban Legend — producer, engineer, mix, keyboards
 Sharp Edges	 - Slice of Life - keyboards
 Special Guests — the first Album — producer, engineer, mix, keyboards
 Stonebolt — Keep It Alive	— keyboards 
 Stonebolt — New Set of Changes — keyboards 
 Stonebolt — Stonebolt — keyboards 
 Suicidal Tendencies — The Art of Rebellion — keyboards 
 The Suits XL — mix
 Tailor-made Fable — mix, keyboards
 Templar  — Under The Sun — producer, engineer, mix, keyboards
 Tragically Hip — We Are the Same  — keyboards
 Van Halen — Balance — keyboards
 The Vincent Black Shadow — Fear Is in the Water — engineer, mix, keyboards
 Warrant — Cherry Pie — keyboards
  West End Girls  - West End Girls - arranger , keyboards
  West End Girls  - We Belong Together - arranger , keyboards
 Winston — Passengers — producer, engineer, mix, keyboards

Film and TV credits

 Absolute Zero (movie score composer/performer)
 Anywhere but Here (20th Century Fox)
 The Anna Nicole Show
 Pop Star Puppy (movie score composer/performer)
 Edgemount (CBC series title track)
 Fashion TV (numerous) 
 A Guy Thing (Jason Lee/Julia Stiles movie)
 Rapid Fire (Movie score composer/performer)
 Sweetwater (HBO)
 Urban Legend (Tri-Star)

Awards

 Juno Award Best Group 1986 — for Red Rider
 Juno Award Roots Traditional 1998 — for The Paperboys
 Juno Award Best Francophone Album 2002 — for Kevin Parent
 Felix Award Engineer of the Year 2002 — for Kevin Parent
 Socan No. 1 Award 2005 — Pour Te Voir

References

Canadian rock musicians
Canadian audio engineers
Canadian record producers
Living people
Red Rider members
20th-century Canadian composers
Canadian rock keyboardists
Canadian male composers
20th-century Canadian male musicians
21st-century Canadian male musicians
1957 births